This is a list of Wisconsin suffragists, suffrage groups and others associated with the cause of women's suffrage in Wisconsin.

Groups 

 Centralia Equal Suffrage Association, founded in 1882.
Grand Rapids Equal Suffrage Association, founded in 1882.
Madison Equal Suffrage Association (MESA), founded in 1879.
Marathon County Woman Suffrage Association, founded in 1879.
Men's League for Women's Suffrage, formed in 1911.
Mukwonago Woman Suffrage Association, founded in 1880.
National Woman's Party branch, founded in 1917.
Olympic Club, founded in 1882 in Milwaukee.
Political Equality League, formed in 1911.
Political Equality League, African American branch in Milwaukee.
Richland Center Women's Club, organized in 1870.
South Side Woman Suffrage Association, founded in 1882 in Milwaukee.
Whitewater Woman Suffrage Club, founded in 1882.
Woman's Club of Baraboo, Wisconsin.
Woman Suffrage Association at Mosinee, founded in 1882.
Woman Suffrage Association of Wisconsin (WSAW), founded in 1869. Later, in 1882, it is known as the Wisconsin Woman Suffrage Association (WWSA).

Suffragists 

 Mathilde Franziska Anneke (Milwaukee).
Harriet Bain (Kenosha).
Stella Baker (Suffragist) (Dexterville).
Emma Curtiss Bascom (Madison).
John Bascom (Madison).
Mary W. Bentley (Marathon).
Meta Berger (Milwaukee).
Emma Brown (Fort Atkinson).
Olympia Brown (Racine).
Vie H. Campbell (Evansville).
Carrie Chapman Catt (Ripon).
Augusta Chapin (Milwaukee).
Helen Holmes Charleton (Broadhead).
Edna Phillips Chynoweth (Madison).
 Clara Bewick Colby (Madison).
Alice B. Curtis (Milwaukee).
James Densmore (Oshkosh).
Mary A. Derrick (Brodhead).
Emma Smith DeVoe.
Martha Parker Dingee (Racine).
Nellie Donaldson.
Marion V. Dudley (Milwaukee).
Almah Jane Frisby (Milwaukee).
Zona Gale (Portage).
Lavinia Goodell (Janesville).
Hattie Tyng Griswold (Columbus).
Sophie Gudden (Grand Rapids).
Helen H. Haight (Waukesha).
Alura Collins Hollister (Mukwonago).
 Jessie Jack Hooper (Oshkosh).
Carrie S. Cook Horton (Milwaukee).
 Ada James (Richland Center).
Laura Briggs James (Richland Center).
Sarah James (Oshkosh).
Rachel Szold Jastrow (Madison).
Charlotte Jordan (Kenosha).
Mabel Judd (Lancaster).
Angie King (Janesville).
Georgiana J. Koppke (Baraboo).
 Belle Case La Follette (Summit, Baraboo, Madison).
Fola La Follette (Madison).
Lucinda Lake (Juda).
Jessie Luther (Madison).
Henry Doty Maxon (Menominee).
Maud Leonard McCreery (Green Bay).
Helen Farnsworth Mears (Oshkosh).
Sarah Munro (Milwaukee).
Meda Neubecker (Waukesha).
Helen R. Olin (Madison).
Nellie Mann Opdale (La Crosse).
Hanna Patchin (New London).
Mary G. Pearce (Milwaukee).
Lila Peckham (Milwaukee).
Nora Perkins (Milwaukee).
Susan Miller Quackenbush (Portage).
Sarah A. Richards (Milwaukee).
Emma Robinson (Kenosha).
Jane Rogers (Milwaukee).
Lutie Stearns (Milwaukee).
Sophie Stathearn (Kaukauna).
Vandalia Varnum Thomas.
Mary Swain Wagner (Milwaukee).
Frances McDonnell Wentworth (Racine).
Pauline Wies (Milwaukee).
Gwendolen Brown Willis (Milwaukee).
Eliza Wilson (Menomonee).
Belle Winestine (Madison).
 Laura Ross Wolcott (Milwaukee).
Edna Wright (Milwaukee).
Theodora W. Youmans (Waukesha).

Politicians who supported women's suffrage 
David Cooper Ayres (Howard) 1872 Wisconsin Blue Book "Universal Suffrage, (Female inclusive)"
Victor L. Berger (Milwaukee).
John T. Dow 
Lucius Fairchild.
Hamilton H. Gray (Lafayette County).
David G. James (Richland Center).
Robert La Follette.
William C. Whitford

Places 

 Jessie Jack Hooper House.

Publications 

 Die Deutsche Frauen-Zeitung.
Oshkosh True Democrat.
 Southport Telegraph.
Wisconsin Chief.
Wisconsin Citizen.

Suffragists campaigning in Wisconsin 

 Susan B. Anthony.
Henry Browne Blackwell.
Carrie Chapman Catt.
Emma Smith DeVoe.
Crystal Eastman.
Lydia Folger Fowler.
Harriet Grim.
Mary E. Haggart.
Elizabeth Boynton Harbert.
Julia Ward Howe.
Elizabeth A. Kingsbury.
Mary Livermore.
Alice Ball Loomis.
Catharine Waugh McCulloch.
Clarina I. H. Nichols.
Maud Wood Park.
Elizabeth Lyle Saxon.
May Wright Sewall.
Anna Howard Shaw.
Elizabeth Cady Stanton.
Lucy Stone.
Alice L. Thompson Waytes.

See also 

 Timeline of women's suffrage in Wisconsin
 Women's suffrage in Wisconsin
 Women's suffrage in states of the United States
 Women's suffrage in the United States

References

Sources

External links 

 On Wisconsin: Celebrating 100 Years of the 19th Amendment

Wisconsin suffrage

Wisconsin suffragists
Activists from Wisconsin
History of Wisconsin
suffragists